is a series of slot machine games from TRIVY Corporation, and later Sammy. It has been adapted into a manga and two anime series.

Plot
Haruka and Aoi are a pair of friends who become the magical Twin Angels in order to fight off evil as the Red and Blue Angels. Their story revolves heavily around tracking down and protecting Seven Amulets; magical pieces of jewelry capable of generating immense power when assembled from a mysterious man known only as Black Trader and his subordinates. They are eventually joined by Kurumi the White Angel.

In the new season, Kurumi (in the form of a hedgehog) seeks the help of Meguri Amatsuki and Sumire Kisaragi as the Rose and Sapphire Twin Angels-in-training, when Haruka and Aoi go missing. This story is about hunting down a mysterious woman known as Mary and her pawns that aim to revive a demon ruler by collecting medals contained with innocent energy sources.

Characters

Protagonists

The spunky and energetic red-headed protagonist. Haruka has a caring, get-going sort of personality that compels her to seek out and help people even when not asked. She is prone to being occasionally ditzy and air-headed but is generally quite wise and worldly. Her alias is Red Angel. She mainly attacks using superhuman strength, agility, and powerful kicks enhanced by red flames which add jet-propulsion to her kicks. Her main attack is the Angel Tornado a powerful flying kick.

A quiet and polite girl with blue hair. Aoi is the reserved foil to Haruka and occasionally the voice of reason. She comes from a very rich and respected family, her grandmother is their private school's principal and the previous Angel in her position. She is also well attended to by a one-eyed warrior butler named Heinojou who has a habit of appearing out of nowhere to tend to her. Her alias is Blue Angel. She attacks using a magical bow and arrow called Angel Arrow which can produce infinite arrows that can split upon firing.

A young genius with black hair and green eyes, she is Aoi's distant cousin who transferred straight from St. Bernardi elementary in Italy. She has a tsundere personality. She takes great pride in her and Aoi's work as Twin Angel and often bumps heads with Haruka who she feels is too crude and weak to be Aoi's partner. She grows to like her as well however. Her alias is White Angel. She apparently doesn't require a Poketen (a hand-held device needed for transformation) to transform. She fights using cat-faced gunpowder bombs.

The spirit living inside their poketens, the magical devices the girls use to transform.
 

The handsome school president. He assists the Twin Angels as a Tuxedo Mask-inspired hero. His main weapons are blue roses he apparently cuts from folded paper. Haruka has a crush on him. He often acts as a Deus Ex Machina either working off-screen to happily resolve a conflict or rendering assistance at exactly the right moments. He is apparently from a rich family yet much of his time is spent doing odd and occasionally humiliating part-time jobs.

St. Cherine Academy

A member of the school newspaper club, she has brown pigtails and glasses. She constantly tries to photograph big scoops mostly involving Twin Angel but all her photos either come out blurry or out of focus.

A young green-haired girl who wears a distinctive beanie with cat ears. She is a typical clumsy girl. She takes care of a magical giant Japanese salamander.
 

The lonely school teacher of Twin Angel. She is in her late twenties and is wracked by fears that she will never get married and earning enough money to make a living. She is eventually hired by Black Trader as Black Carrier. She is a formidable fighter in hand-to-hand and employs her own set of robots. Despite that she is very caring and noble, she avoids committing any serious crime and even cleans up any destruction she causes. She falls in love with Black Trader but gives up on him when she realizes that he is not a good person.

Recurring antagonists

A gothic-lolita dressed blonde girl who served as the Twin Angel's first opponent before she was fired and exiled to the South Pole by Black Trader. She fought entirely using specially constructed giant robots. She is assisted by her bumbling, masochistic servant Alexander who is infatuated with her. She neither particularly abusive or ungrateful towards him but he seems to enjoy throwing himself into unpleasant circumstances for her sake.
 / 

Black Trader's Twin Phantom. Tesla is the eldest, and Nine is the youngest of the Violet sisters. Tesla has long aqua-colored hair and fights using electric powers, and Nine has short aqua-colored hair and fights using a large magical sword. She rarely speaks, but likes animals. The sisters lost their parents in a arson incident, but were 'rescued' by Black Trader who adopted them when he had lied to them about the Twin Angels being responsible. Nine became close to Haruka not knowing she's a Twin Angel. Discovering Black Trader's true colors, Nine and Tesla changed allegiance to Twin Angels.

The mysterious antagonist who seeks the Seven Amulets and tries to destroy the Twin Angels. He was an assistant to Oscar Violet, the Violet sisters' father, into researching the amulets, but the two were often in conflict about it.

Mary is the sexy demonic leader of the Four Heavenly Kings and the most frequent antagonist against Meguru and Sumire. She poses as the nurse of St. Cherine Academy under the alias Ari Oginome. Mary later somehow deduces the Twin Angels' identities and attempts using a despaired Meguru as a catalyst for the energy sources Mary collected from innocent humans in order to revive her beloved Zelucifer, a great demon. When her mission fails, she activates a dead man's switch summoning a destructive ship that rages upon the earth.
 / 
Twin pop idols stage name Twenty-Eight. Veil and Nui are silver-haired siblings who are talent and hard-working. In reality the twins are dolls given life by Mary and since collaborate promising them full body flesh. They enroll at St. Cherine Academy to further access energy. Meguru and Veil form a bond, but Nui and Sumire are seen as foes. Meguru discovers Veil's secret yet she accepts her. As Meguru has the siblings see the error of their ways, they renounce Mary, and tragically she detonates the bodies. Misty Knight installed the dolls in Mary's weapon ship to intercept the berserk and save the earth. In a cliffhanger, the dolls are found by a silhouette (possibly Zelucifer).

Twin Angel Break characters
 

Meguri is a resident of Chiichi Island who moved to Tokyo. Her personality strikingly resembles Haruka's. One of her hobbies is photography. In the past, Meguri witnessed the Twin Angels flying and idolize to become one too. It is revealed Meguri descended from some sort of religious cult and she and Sumire have met in their youth.
 

Sumire is Yuito's younger sister. She serve as Meguri's Twin Angel partner. Despite her antisocial nature and lack of desire to become a Twin Angel, she eventually grows into the role and becomes good friends with Meguri. Sumire is extremely fond of her brother and has a great deal of hunger (carrying six lunch boxes) due to low blood pressure. Sumire is also a member of the kendo club.

She actually is Kurumi from the original series magically transformed to a hedgehog. She requests help from Meguri and Sumire to become Twin Angels while the original team, Haruka and Aoi, are captured in suspended animation.

Media

Original video anime

Episode list

Manga

Anime television series
In December 2010, a promotional video at Sammy's Comic Market booth announced that a new anime television series was planned for 2011 with the J.C.Staff producing the animation. Titled , the series began its broadcast run in Japan on TV Kanagawa on July 5, 2011, at 1:45am. The North American media website Crunchyroll simulcast the series under the title Twin Angel: Twinkle Paradise. The anime series has two pieces of theme music. The opening theme is  performed by Ave;new Project feat. Saori Sakura and Rie Shirasawa and the ending theme is "Shining☆Star" performed by Yukari Tamura, Mamiko Noto and Rie Kugimiya, the voices of Haruka Minazuki, Aoi Kannazuki and Kurumi Hazuki, respectively. A new TV anime has been announced titled Twin Angel BREAK, serving as the sequel to Twinkle Paradise, premiered on April 7, 2017. The opening theme of Twin Angel BREAK is  performed by Ave;new Project feat. Mao Ichimichi and Ai Kayano, the voices of Meguru Amatsuki and Sumire Kisaragi. The ending theme is "Break Kurumi Milk Club!" performed by Rie Kugimiya. Crunchyroll later streamed the anime series.

Kaitou Tenshi Twin Angel: Kyun Kyun Tokimeki Paradise

Episode list

References

External links
Sammy portal page
Sammy slot machine page: TA1, TA2, TA3
TRIVY Corporation page: TA1
TV series page: KKDP, BREAK
NOMAD page: TA
J.C.Staff page: KKDP (TV), KKDP (OVA)
Radio station Onsen page: TAR

Alchemist page: PSP

2008 anime OVAs
2011 anime television series debuts
2017 anime television series debuts
J.C.Staff
Crime in anime and manga
Kadokawa Shoten manga
Nomad (company)
Shōnen manga